"The Beast", known by the Japanese title  is the second episode of the anime Neon Genesis Evangelion, created by Gainax. The episode was written by the series director Hideaki Anno and Yōji Enokido and directed by Kazuya Tsurumaki. It aired originally on TV Tokyo on October 11, 1995.

The series is set fifteen years after a worldwide cataclysm, particularly in the futuristic fortified city of Tokyo-3. The protagonist is Shinji Ikari, a teenage boy who is recruited by his father Gendo to the organization Nerv to pilot a giant bio-machine mecha named Evangelion into combat with beings called Angels. During the episode, Shinji faces the Angel Sachiel but freezes with fear and fails to defend his Eva-01, which is left damaged and inoperable. Shinji wakes up in a hospital the next day and is taken in by Nerv's Captain Misato Katsuragi, who becomes his new legal guardian.

Production of "The Beast" began in September 1994 and ended in May 1995. Staff used Christian religious symbolism in the episode, with the intent of differentiating the show from other mecha series. The title itself, "The Beast", references the beast from the sea from the Book of Revelation. The episode scored a 5.3% rating of audience share on Japanese TV and received critical and public acclaim focused on its visuals, direction, and sound.

Plot
Pilot Shinji Ikari prepares to face an enemy named Sachiel, third of a series of beings called Angels, in his mecha Evangelion 01. Shinji manages to move his Eva, making it try a successful first step. But as he attempts to take a second step, the Eva trips, falls over and lands face first on the ground. Eva-01 is left helpless as Sachiel advances on it; Shinji is frozen with fear, and fails to defend himself as the Angel proceeds to pick up the Eva by the face, and then damages its left arm and right eye. The pilot's signal is lost, and the Eva powers down. Suddenly, a confused Shinji wakes up in a hospital room the next day; the dramatic battle having been resolved off-screen. Meanwhile, his father, Gendo Ikari, head of the special agency Nerv, meets with the organization's mysterious benefactors, the Human Instrumentality Committee. The Chairman of the Committee, Keel Lorenz, instructs him not to let the reappearance of the Angels allow a process named the Human Instrumentality Project to fall behind schedule. Shinji sees his fellow pilot Rei Ayanami at the hospital. He also has a brief encounter with his father, but the two of them don't talk. Nerv's captain Misato Katsuragi shows up to check up on Shinji in the aftermath of the battle. When she learns that Shinji is going to live alone, she decides to take him in to live with her instead.

Shinji arrive at Misato's apartment. Later that evening, he lies alone in his new bedroom. As he does so, sounds from the battle are heard and images of nerve cells as viewed through a microscope flash across the screen. In a flashback, Shinji remembers that Eva-01 was rendered inoperative by Sachiel's attack, with Nerv losing control of the Eva. Eva-01 reactivates and begins to act on its own. It launches a vicious attack upon the Angel, succeeding in damaging its face. A second attack by the Eva is blocked by a barrier named A.T. Field, but the Eva erodes it with another A.T. Field. Once the barrier is down, Eva-01 soundly defeats Sachiel by shattering the downed Angel's core. Sachiel wraps itself around the Eva and self destructs; Eva-01 emerges from the explosion with little apparent damage. As Nerv regains control of the Evangelion, Shinji comes to in the cockpit. The damaged helmet sloughs off, and Shinji can glimpse the Eva's face reflected in the windows of a building. As he looks on, the Eva's eye regenerates and focuses straight at him. Shinji begins to scream and the flashback ends. He slowly curls up in bed after recalling the battle; Misato comes to his door and praises him for piloting the Eva and saving the city.

Production

Production for "The Beast" began in September 1994, simultaneously with "Angel Attack", and ended in May 1995. Yōji Enokido and Hideaki Anno wrote the script, while Kazuya Tsurumaki served as director for the episode. Unlike the previous installment, Gainax produced  "The Beast" with a non-linear narrative, interspersed with continuous flashbacks and scene changes; Anno remained dissatisfied with "Angel Attack" during the post recording and described it as "a failure", since it couldn't beat the first episode of the original Mobile Suit Gundam series. He was disappointed by the script and the structure, judging it "three minutes too long", so he completely reworked "The Beast" in the middle. Continuing their work from "Angel Attack", Anno and assistant director Masayuki composed the storyboards. For the combat between Eva-01 and Sachiel, Takeshi Honda, chief animator for the episode, and Yoh Yoshinari handled the key animation. Shinya Hasegawa handled the key animation around the scene where Misato is drinking beer in her apartment and suggests Shinji take a bath, while Yoshitō Asari and Seiji Kio served as assistant character designers.

The Japanese title "Unfamiliar Ceilings" was decided on in 1993, when Gainax published a presentation document of Neon Genesis Evangelion titled  . The beginning of a battle between an Angel named Raziel and berserk Unit 01 was planned for "Angel Attack" in the "Proposal", but during production it was moved to "The Beast" and the Angel changed to Sachiel. For the battle between Eva-01 and Sachiel Gainax created integration between the backdrops and the moving objects on several levels. The fight was initially close to a tokusatsu battle in the style of Ultraman, but, according to Yuichiro Oguro, during production Honda apparently decided to give the scene a more anime style. Oguro noted that Honda draws characters in a more sophisticated style, unlike the animation director of the first episode Shunji Suzuki, who tries to be more faithful to Sadamoto's character design instead. He also noted that people are depicted at the edge of the screen in "The Beast", a style he attributes to Masayuki.

To represent Sachiel's AT Field the main staff used special lighting effects, which appear and disappear for short frames. Yoshinari took care of the battle scene, trying to draw the shoulders and face of the Eva-01 using rulers. The staff also made extensive use of close-ups during the episode. During the battle, before Eva-01 berserk mode, the crew zoomed in on Shinji's face in close-up giving the idea of wide-angle lens, and deforming it with CG. For the image of the Eva-01 destroying the AT Field, Hideaki Anno took inspiration from the image of tearing clothes, considering them as the most elementary form of protection for human beings; the concept was included in "The Beast" with no philosophical implications, and Anno thought about its meaning as the "walls of the heart" during the production of the latter part of the series. He also added the term Human Instrumentality Project, one of the most important concepts for the plot, by improvising and without having clear ideas about it. "I still had no idea about what it was going to 'complement'. ... It's just a verbal bluff", he said.

In the hospital scene, where Shinji stands alone in an empty corridor, contrasts of light and shadow were used, keeping the scene monochromatic, to represent Shinji's inner emptiness. Furthermore, the main staff used real brands in "The Beast" scenes, including a Mitsubishi Fuso truck, a Sony Digital Audio Tape and Yebisu beer. Yuko Miyamura, Katsumi Suzuki, Megumi Hayashibara and Takashi Nagasako voiced unidentified characters in "The Beast", while Nagasako, Suzumi, Motomu Kiyokawa and Koyasu Takehito voiced the men of the Istrumentality Committee. Besides the original soundtrack, composed by Shiro Sagisu, Gainax also used You are the only one by Kotono Mitsuishi, Misato's voice actress, published in her image album Lilia ~from Ys~ (1992). British singer Claire Littley sang a cover of "Fly Me to the Moon" named "Normal Version" which was later used as the episode's closing theme song, replaced in late home video editions by a "String Version" sung by the same singer.

Cultural references
The scene where Misato talks about air conditioning in a truck with Ritsuko is a reference to Nadia: The Secret of Blue Water, Gainax's previous work, while the sequence in which Eva-01 is bleeding from the skull is similar to a scene from the Getter Robo manga, of which Anno is a fan. Moreover, in the scene where Misato dines with Shinji in the apartment the staff used the "Gainax bounce", a fan service that made the breasts of the female characters bounce. The city of Tokyo-3 is mentioned in "The Beast" for the first time. Its name is a tribute to the spaceship Tokyo III from the movie Sayonara Jupiter (1984). The scientific concept of phase space is also mentioned in relation to Sachiel's AT Field during Eva-01's battle. Japanese reviewer Akio Nagatomi described the outcome of Eva-01's first battle as "very typical Hideaki Anno", noting how the director used "the exact same flashback/exposition technique" in Gunbuster, when Noriko Takaya in a bath recounts her meeting with Coach Ōta with some differences. Dennis Redmond interpreted the last image of the flashback of the battle against Sachiel, in which a close-up of Shinji's eye is visible while the boy screams in terror, as a quotation of "one of the first great video tropes", the close shots of Sally's quivering eye in The Texas Chain Saw Massacre (1974).

"The Beast" uses religious symbolism, including the Christian cross, for the Misato pendant and the Eva-00 cockpit. Angel Sachiel also explodes in the final scenes of the episode, forming a cross-shaped explosion. An official pamphlet states that the cross has the meaning as a symbol of death and self-sacrifice, although it's not clear which meaning the series follows. The director of "The Beast", Kazuya Tsurumaki, said in an interview that Christian graphic symbols were used for artistic reasons by the main staff, because they were considered "cool" for the Japanese audience, and they were intended to differentiate Neon Genesis Evangelion from other mecha anime. According to the official booklets and materials, the title "The Beast" can refer to the Angel Sachiel, the berserk Eva-01 or Shinji's hidden destructive impulses. The official encyclopedia Evangelion Chronicle states that the title also references the beast from the sea, introduced in the Book of Revelation.

Reception
"The Beast" aired on 11 October 1995 and scored a 5.3% rating of audience share on Japanese TV. It also screened with "Angel Attack" in front of two hundred people at the second Gainax festival on 22 and 23 July 1995 in Itako, Ibaraki, a few months before the airing. According to Gainax co-founder Yasuhiro Takeda, the work received a positive reception. Official merchandise based on the episode has also been released, including lighters and T-shirts. Critics, including Anime News Network and Newtype magazine, received Neon Genesis Evangelions first two episodes positively. Film School Rejects's Max Covill praised "The Beast" as did animator Yūichirō Oguro, writing for Newtype magazine, who praised its animation. Multiversity Comics' Matthew Garcia similarly lauded the confidence in the film-making and the animation of "Angel Attack" and "The Beast", eulogizing the "assurance and tenacity" of Anno and Gainax.

Anime News Network's Kyle Pope said, "The purpose of this episode was to establish the character of Misato which can be summed up in two words: alcoholic slut". The Animé Café's Japanese reviewer Akio Nagatomi criticized "The Beast" mood as "emotionally manipulative", since the viewer is supposed to be sorry for Shinji but "subtlety seems to be beyond the grasp of the writers". Jane Nagatomi similarly described the story as "fairly weak", criticizing the idea behind the Umbilical Cable but also praising the humour of the scenes involving Pen-Pen. Jack Cameron of Screen Rant regarded Shinji's battle against Sachiel as one of the best Neon Genesis Evangelion fights. Comic Book Resources' editor Ajay Aravind similarly ranked it third among the best battles in the show. SyFy Wire's Daniel Dockery listed it as one of the "most awesome non-depressing" moments in the series, since "there's just something awe-inspiring and terrifying and uncomfortable about watching an uncontrollable Eva unit". Reuben Baron of Comic Book Resources also eulogized the battle, describing it as an example of the "warped brutality of Hideaki Anno's vision". Academic Susan J. Napier noticed the unconventionality of the fight, since Shinji shows reluctance and feelings "that seems less than conventionally heroic", and praised the fight sequence as it ends up "in a fascinatingly low-tech manner", while Ex magazine's Charles McCarter lauded the animation as "nice and clean", the soundtrack and the pace of the first two episodes.

The first scene with Seele inspired a similar scene from the manga Jujutsu Kaisen 0, in which the lead Yuta Okkotsu is questioned by people seeking to control a Curse following him; writer Gege Akutami declared himself a fan of Anno's works. British rock band Fightstar named the song "Unfamiliar Ceilings", contained in the album One Day Son, This Will All Be Yours, after Neon Genesis Evangelion.

References
  Text was copied/adapted from Episode 02 at Evageeks wiki, which is released under a Creative Commons Attribution-Share Alike 3.0 (Unported) (CC-BY-SA 3.0) license.

External links
 

1995 Japanese television episodes
Neon Genesis Evangelion episodes
Science fiction television episodes
Biblical topics in popular culture